Clockers is a 1995 American crime drama film directed by Spike Lee. It is an adaptation of the 1992 novel of the same name by Richard Price, who also co-wrote the screenplay with Lee. The film stars Harvey Keitel, John Turturro, Delroy Lindo, and Mekhi Phifer in his debut film role. Set in New York City, Clockers tells the story of Strike (Phifer), a street-level drug dealer who becomes entangled in a murder investigation.

The film originally entered production with Martin Scorsese attached to direct; he had previously collaborated with Price on his 1986 film The Color of Money. Scorsese eventually dropped out of production to focus on his passion project Casino, at which point Lee stepped in to direct and rewrite the script, Scorsese remained a co-producer alongside Lee. Clockers received generally positive reviews from film critics, but was a box office failure, grossing only around $13 million on a $25 million budget.

Plot
In a Brooklyn housing project, a group of clockers — street-level drug dealers — sells drugs for Rodney Little, a local drug lord. Rodney tells Ronald "Strike" Dunham, one of his lead clockers, that another dealer, Darryl Adams, is stealing from him and that he wants Strike to kill him. Strike then meets with his brother, Victor, and asks if he knows someone who could kill Darryl.

Homicide detectives Rocco Klein and Larry Mazilli, riding to the scene of Adams' murder, receive a phone call from another detective who says a man has confessed at a local church to killing Adams. The police meet Strike's older brother Victor at the church and take him in for questioning. In the interrogation room, Victor tells Rocco that he shot Adams in self-defense. Rocco finds holes in this story and starts looking into Victor's background, which includes two jobs, a wife, two children, no criminal record, and aspirations to move out of the projects, and concludes that Victor is covering for his younger brother.

Rodney discusses Darryl's death with Strike. Later, Rodney tells Strike a story of a younger Rodney and Errol, where Errol threatened Rodney at gunpoint to kill a dealer, which he did. Back in the present, he tells Strike the reason Errol forced him at gunpoint to do so was so that Errol could hold something over him if he ever decided to tell on Errol, which was why he told Strike to kill Darryl Adams. Strike and Rodney have a falling-out after Rodney denies telling Strike to kill Darryl.

Rocco pressures Strike, but Victor sticks to his story, so Rocco convinces Rodney that Strike has confessed and informed on Rodney's drug ring. Rocco arrests Rodney and then implicates Strike in front of his crew. Strike tries to play it off and deny that he was involved in Rodney's arrest, but his crew begins to turn on Strike, leading to them labeling him a snitch. Rodney, calling Errol to notify him that he is in jail, puts a hit out on Strike. Strike then gets together some money and decides to leave town.

As Strike walks to his car, he sees Errol sitting on his car, deducing that Errol is there to kill him. Strike hides behind a fence, but a younger boy who admired Strike, Tyrone (Pee Wee Love), rides up to Errol on a bike and shoots him dead with Strike's gun. Later, Tyrone is taken into custody. With Rocco, Tyrone's mother (Regina Taylor) and Andre listening, Tyrone confesses that he got the gun from Strike. Andre storms out of the interrogation room and proceeds to look for Strike.

Andre angrily beats Strike in front of the whole project, and with a gun threatens the onlooking bystanders to stay back. As Andre threatens to kill Strike if he ever talks to or even looks at the young boy again, Rodney pulls up, which leads to Strike jumping in his own car and driving to the precinct, with Rodney following. Strike runs into Rocco, who now has an arrest warrant for Strike, and runs into the precinct just as Rodney pulls up.

Rocco tries to intimidate Strike into confessing to the murder, but he loses his composure when Strike continues to change his story. When Rocco grabs Strike and throws him against the wall, Strike's mother walks in with Mazilli and Victor's wife. She advises Rocco that Victor confessed to the murder immediately when he got home, and how Victor was physically unable to leave his bed. Strike asks his mom what happened to the bail money he gave Victor's wife, which leads to Strike's mother angrily throwing the money in Strike's face.

Meanwhile, Rodney proceeds to damage Strike's car, going as far as breaking the windows, damaging the doors and urinating in the car. Left with no other options and unable to go home, Strike asks Rocco to drive him to Penn Station.

As they are sitting in a car, Rocco threatens Strike that if he ever sees him again he will arrest him, let Andre beat him down again, then arrest Rodney on the same charges and make sure that Rodney and Strike share a cell and a bed in prison. Strike boards a train and leaves town. While Tyrone is playing inside his apartment with the train set that Strike gave him, outside the apartment, Rocco and Mazilli respond to the homicide of Scientific, one of the guys in Strike's old crew. The film ends with a shot of Strike looking outward on a moving train, apparently far away from the city.

Cast

Film poster
Critics and film buffs were quick to notice that the poster, designed by Art Sims, was similar to the artwork of Saul Bass for Otto Preminger's 1959 film Anatomy of a Murder. Sims claimed that it was a homage, but Bass regarded it as a rip-off.

Release

Critical reception
The film received generally positive reviews. The review aggregator Rotten Tomatoes records that 73% of the 62 reviewers viewed it positively. The site's consensus reads, "A work of mournful maturity that sacrifices little of its director's signature energy, Clockers is an admittedly flawed drama with a powerfully urgent message". On Metacritic, the film has a score of 71 out of 100 based on reviews from 20 critics, indicating "generally favorable reviews".

Roger Ebert gave the movie three-and-a-half stars.

David Denby of New York said that while the original novel was "filled with operational detail" the film adaptation was "more emotional" and "less factual". Denby further explained that Spike Lee was "concerned less with Strike's spiritual condition than with the survival of the entire community." Denby said that Lee, in the work, "jumps around a lot, telling his story in hot flashes" as typical in Spike Lee films, arguing that the technique makes the film "difficult to follow". In regard to the cinematography of Malik Sayeed, Denby said that it was "rough and dark-hued, with an almost tabloid angriness in the scenes of violence."

Box office
The movie was a box office failure.

Soundtrack

Clockers (Original Motion Picture Soundtrack) was released on August 25, 1995, through MCA Soundtracks. Composed of twelve songs, it features performances from Marc Dorsey, Rebelz of Authority, BrooklyNytes, Buckshot LeFonque, Chaka Khan, Crooklyn Dodgers '95, Des'ree, Mega Banton, Seal and Strictly Difficult. The album made it to #54 on the Billboard Top R&B/Hip-Hop Albums chart in the United States, spawning two singles: "Return of the Crooklyn Dodgers" by Jeru the Damaja, O.C. and Chubb Rock, which peaked at #96 on the Billboard Hot 100, and "Love Me Still" by Chaka Khan.

One song featured in the film but not included in the original motion picture soundtrack is R&B artist Philip Bailey's "Children of the Ghetto," from Bailey's 1984 album Chinese Wall.

Track listing

Charts

See also

List of hood films

References

External links

1995 crime drama films
40 Acres and a Mule Filmworks films
American coming-of-age drama films
American crime drama films
Films about drugs
Films directed by Spike Lee
Films set in Brooklyn
Films shot in New Mexico
Films shot in New York City
1990s hip hop films
Hood films
Films based on American novels
Films with screenplays by Richard Price (writer)
Films with screenplays by Spike Lee
Universal Pictures films
Films scored by Terence Blanchard
Films produced by Martin Scorsese
Films produced by Jon Kilik
1990s English-language films
1990s American films